Andre J. Cisco (born March 23, 2000) is an American football safety for the Jacksonville Jaguars of the National Football League (NFL). He played college football at Syracuse, and was drafted by the Jaguars in the third round of the 2021 NFL Draft.

Early years
Cisco attended St. Anthony's High School in South Huntington, New York, before transferring to IMG Academy in Bradenton, Florida prior to his junior season. He committed to Syracuse University to play college football.

College career
As a freshman at Syracuse in 2018, Cisco started 11 of 13 games. He recorded 60 tackles and seven interceptions, which was tied for most in the nation. He was the ACC Defensive Rookie of the Year and was a freshman All-American. Cisco started nine games his sophomore season, missing three due to injury, and had 65 tackles, five interceptions and a touchdown.

Professional career

Cisco was selected by the Jacksonville Jaguars in the third round (65th overall) of the 2021 NFL Draft. He signed his four-year rookie contract with the Jaguars on June 10, 2021. Cisco appeared in 17 games, of which he started the last three, as a rookie. He totaled 26 total tackles, two passes defended, and two forced fumbles. In Week 4, against the Philadelphia Eagles, he recorded a 59-yard interception return for a touchdown in the 29–21 loss. He appeared in 15 games, of which he started all of them. He finished with one sack, 73 total tackles, three interceptions, and ten passes defended.

References

External links

Jacksonville Jaguars bio
Syracuse Orange bio

2000 births
Living people
Sportspeople from Queens, New York
Players of American football from New York City
American football safeties
Syracuse Orange football players
Jacksonville Jaguars players